Sir James Stansfeld,  (5 March 182017 February 1898) was a British Radical and Liberal politician and social reformer who served as Under-Secretary of State for India (1866), Financial Secretary to the Treasury (1869–71) and President of the Poor Law Board (1871) before being appointed the first President of the Local Government Board (1871–74 and 1886).

Background
Stansfeld was born at Akeds Road, Halifax, the only son of James Stansfeld Sr (1792–1872) and his wife Emma Ralph (1793–1851), daughter of John Ralph (d.1795), minister of the Northgate-End Unitarian chapel, Halifax and his wife, Dorothy (1754–1824).

Stansfeld's father, James Sr, was the sixth son of David Stansfield (1755–1818) of Hope Hall, Halifax, and his wife Sarah Wolrich (1757–1824), daughter of Thomas Wolrich (1719–91) of Armley House, Leeds. He was a descendant of the Stansfeld family of Stansfield and Sowerby, Yorkshire, and a distant cousin of the politician William Crompton-Stansfield and the soldiers James Rawdon Stansfeld, Thomas Wolryche Stansfeld and John R. E. Stansfeld.

James Sr was originally a member of a firm of solicitors, Stansfeld & Craven, and subsequently served as a county-court judge in the Halifax district. James Stansfeld Jr's sister, Mary (d.1885), married the Liberal MP George Dixon.

Education
Brought up as a nonconformist, Stansfeld was in 1837 sent to University College, London, and graduated BA in 1840 and LLB in 1844. He was admitted a student of the Middle Temple on 31 October 1840, and was called to the bar on 26 January 1849; he does not seem, however, to have practised as a barrister, and later in life derived his income mainly from a brewery at Fulham.

On 27 July 1844, Stansfeld married Caroline, second daughter of William Henry Ashurst, a radical and friend of Giuseppe Mazzini, to whom Stansfeld was introduced in 1847: they became close. Stansfeld also sympathised with the Chartist movement, even if Feargus O'Connor denounced him. He took an active part in propagating radical opinions in the north of England, frequently spoke at meetings of the Northern Reform Union, and was one of the promoters of the association for the repeal of "taxes on knowledge".

Political career

In 1859, Stansfeld was returned to Parliament as a Radical member for Halifax, which he continued to represent for over thirty-six years. He voted consistently on the Radical side, but his chief energies were devoted to promoting the cause of Italian unity. He was selected by Giuseppe Garibaldi as his adviser when the Italian patriot visited England in 1862. In 1863, he moved in the House of Commons a resolution of sympathy with the Poles.

Stansfeld became Civil Lord of the Admiralty in April 1863. In 1864, as the result of charges made against him by the French authorities, in connection with Greco's conspiracy against Napoleon III, Disraeli, in the House of Commons, accused him of "being in correspondence with the assassins of Europe." Stansfeld was vigorously defended by John Bright and William Edward Forster, and his explanation was accepted as quite satisfactory by Palmerston. Nevertheless, he only escaped a vote of censure by ten votes, and accordingly resigned office in April 1864.

In 1865, he was re-elected for Halifax, and became the seventh Under-Secretary of State for India in February 1866 (until July) under Lord Russell. He served in Gladstone's first administration (1868)–74) as a third Lord of the Treasury between December 1868 and November 1869, as Financial Secretary to the Treasury between 2 November 1869 and 17 March 1871, and as the twelfth and last President of the Poor Law Board (with a seat in the cabinet) from March to August 1871, before being appointed the first President of the Local Government Board, on 19 August 1871, a post he held until the Liberals lost power in February 1874. He was sworn of the Privy Council in February 1869.

The remainder of his life was mainly spent in endeavouring to secure the repeal of the Contagious Diseases Acts, and in 1886 this objective was attained. He did not serve in Gladstone's second administration (1880–5), and declined the twice-repeated offer of the Deputy Speakership. He later returned to government in Gladstone's third administration on 3 April 1886, when he again became President of the Local Government Board. However, the government fell in July of the same year. Stansfeld did not serve in Gladstone's last administration (1892)–5) and refused a peerage. However, before Lord Rosebery left office in June 1895, Stansfeld was appointed Knight Grand Cross of the Order of the Bath in the 1895 Birthday Honours. He retired as MP for Halifax in the same month.

Personal life
Stansfeld married Caroline, second daughter of William Henry Ashurst, on 27 July 1844. Their son was the barrister-at-law Joseph James Stansfeld (b. 1852). After his wife's death, on 22 June 1887, Stansfeld married his second wife, Frances, widow of Henry Augustus Severn of Sydney.

Stansfeld died, aged 77, at his residence, Castle Hill, Rotherfield, Sussex, on 17 February 1898, and was buried at Rotherfield on 22 February 1898.

Ancestry

See also 
 William Crompton-Stansfield
 Field House, Sowerby
 Dunninald Castle

References

Attribution

External links 

1820 births
1898 deaths
Stansfeld family
People from Halifax, West Yorkshire
Members of the Middle Temple
Knights Grand Cross of the Order of the Bath
Liberal Party (UK) MPs for English constituencies
Members of the Privy Council of the United Kingdom
UK MPs 1859–1865
UK MPs 1865–1868
UK MPs 1868–1874
UK MPs 1874–1880
UK MPs 1880–1885
UK MPs 1885–1886
UK MPs 1886–1892
UK MPs 1892–1895
People from Rotherfield
Lords of the Admiralty